Mister Films, Ltd was a British film studio (based first in Epping and then at Shepperton Studios) that made and produced all of the Mr Men and Little Miss programmes from 1974 through 1991. The company also produced several television ads, cinema adverts and one feature film.

History
Mister Films Ltd was established in 1973 by Terry Ward and Trevor Bond.

The company closed down in 2004 when along with the Mr Men and Little Miss underlying rights owned by Mrs Christine Hargreaves and Mr Films Ltd was bought by Chorion. For £28 million pounds.

Trevor Bond retired to Florida, where he died in 2023, and Terry Ward retired to the Surrey countryside.

Key people
Roger Hargreaves - ChairmanChristine Hargreaves - co-CEOTerry Ward - Mr Men Animation Director Co-CEOTrevor Bond - Animation Producer

Produced
Mr Men - All Mr Men and Little Miss animated films and TV shows (1974-2004)

References

Defunct film and television production companies of the United Kingdom
British companies established in 1973
1991 disestablishments in the United Kingdom
Entertainment companies established in 1973
Entertainment companies disestablished in 1991